Guy I (died 860) was the Duke of Spoleto from 842. He was the son of Lambert I of Nantes and Adelaide of Lombardy, the eldest daughter of Pepin of Italy. He travelled with his father in 834 in the entourage of Lothair I. He was given the abbey of Mettlach in Lotharingia in 840, when the Emperor Louis the Pious died.

Guy married Ida (Itta, Ita or Itana), daughter of Sico of Benevento. Their sons were Lambert I and Guy III. In 843, he interfered in the Beneventan civil war on the side of his brother-in-law Siconulf. He acted as arbiter several times for high fees, but only Lothair's successor, the Emperor Louis II, could end the strife. In 846, he alone succeeded in driving the Saracens out of Latium after their sack of Saint Peter's Basilica in Rome.

In 858, he supported Adhemar of Salerno against the pretended Count of Capua, Lando I. By his intervention he secured the Liri Valley, with Sora and Arpino taken from the count's brother Landenulf of Teano.

Notes

References

Sources

Llewellyn, Peter. Rome in the Dark Ages. London: Faber and Faber, 1970. .
di Carpegna Falconieri, Tommaso. Guido, in Dizionario biografico degli italiani, 61, Roma: Istituto della Enciclopedia italiana, 2003, p. 352-354.

860 deaths
9th-century dukes of Spoleto
Guideschi dynasty
Year of birth unknown